Kirsten Bomblies is an American biological researcher. Her research focuses primarily on species in the Arabidopsis genus, particularly Arabidopsis arenosa. She has studied processes related to speciation and hybrid incompatibility, and currently focuses on the adaptive evolution of meiosis in response to climate and genome change.

She was assistant professor and then Thomas D. Cabot Associate Professor of Organismic and Evolutionary Biology at Harvard University from 2009 until 2015. She briefly moved her lab to the John Innes Centre in Norwich, UK (2015-2019) before moving to the ETH in Zürich Switzerland to take up a full professorship in Plant Evolutionary Genetics and Molecular Biology in early 2019. She was born in 1973 in Germany and grew up in Castle Rock, Colorado. She received her Bachelor of Arts in biochemistry and biology from The University of Pennsylvania in 1996.

For her PhD with John Doebley at the University of Wisconsin - Madison, she studied extant domesticated Maize (called "Corn" colloquially in United States) with some study of Teosinte, its wild precursor.  She examined how these plants as well as organisms in general develop to their extant form and function due to the influence of their component genes, proteins and other intrinsic and extrinsic forces.

As a postdoc with Detlef Weigel at the Max Planck Institute for Developmental Biology in Tübingen, Germany, she began to study how individuals interact with other organisms and to examine selection forces within and across species boundaries, accessions, chronological gradients and other delineations.  The work has an experimental component but the theoretical implications of the discoveries Bomblies and her colleagues made have received much attention.

She was awarded a MacArthur Fellowship in 2008.  She joined the faculty of Harvard University in July 2009 and the ETH in 2019.

At ETH Zürich Bomblies studies the evolution of meiosis, particularly recombination and chromosome segregation.

In 2022 she received the "Golden Owl", an award which is voted on by the students and given by the VSETH (the students association of ETH) to lecturers for "exceptional teaching".

In her spare time she does illustrations, etchings and other art. She loves hiking, rock climbing, and other sports.

References

Professor Kirsten Bomblies at ETH Zürich
Kirsten Bomblies at the MacArthur Foundation
Incoming faculty Harvard University, Department of Organismic and Evolutionary Biology
German-American plant evolution biologist wins MacArthur Award, Max Planck Institute for Developmental Biology, September 23, 2008

Further reading

Art by Kirsten Bomblies 

1973 births
Living people
Harvard University faculty
University of Wisconsin–Madison alumni
21st-century American biologists
MacArthur Fellows
People from Castle Rock, Colorado